Güdül is a rural town and district of Ankara Province in the Central Anatolia region of Turkey, 90 km north-west of the city of Ankara, off the motorway to Istanbul. The district covers an area of 419 km², and the average elevation is 720 m. According to 2010 census, population of the district is 8971 of which 2623 live in the town of Güdül with the majority in the surrounding countryside.

Güdül is a mountainous district with a dry climate featuring cold winters (down to -20 °C), hot summers (up to 35 °C) and a little rain in spring and autumn. There is some agriculture and the  crops include hot peppers and chick peas, which are dried and sold as leblebi.

History
Research shows occupation since prehistoric times, and caves along the river Kirmir contain stone workings apparently by the Hittites (2000 BC). Later the area was occupied by Phrygians, Ancient Romans and Byzantines (one of the caves has a carved cross from the early spread of Christianity under Roman rule).

In 1071, the Byzantine armies were defeated by the Turks at the battle of Malazgirt, and soon afterwards all of central Anatolia came under Turkish control. Güdül was occupied by Seljuk Turks, including the lord of Ankara, Şehabüldevle Güdül Bey.

Administrative divisions

Towns
 Çağa
 Sorgun
 Yeşilöz

Villages

Places of interest
 The lake and forest near the village of Sorgun, north of Güdül
 The caves in the valley of the Kirmir

Image gallery

Notes

References

External links

 District governor's official website 

 
Populated places in Ankara Province
Districts of Ankara Province
Cittaslow